Horacio González (1 February 1944 – 22 June 2021) was an Argentine teacher and essayist. Until December 2015, he was the director of the National Library of the Argentine Republic.

Life
Horacio has Italian descent through his maternal grandfather, born in Recanati, Marche. He graduated in sociology at the University of Buenos Aires in 1970. He got the doctorate of social sciences at the Brazilian University of São Paulo in 1992. He was a university teacher since 1968, with academic tenure at the University of Buenos Aires, the National University of Rosario and the Facultad Libre de Rosario. He was part of the Carta Abierta group, and he was the director of the National Library of the Argentine Republic, for the period from 2005 to 2015.

Death
González tested positive for COVID-19 on 19 May 2021, and was admitted to the Sanatorium Güemes in Buenos Aires on that day. He died of the disease on 22 June 2021.

Works
 La ética picaresca, 1992.
 La realidad satírica. Doce hipótesis sobre Página/12, 1992.
 Decorados, 1993.
 El filósofo cesante, 1995
 Arlt: política y locura, 1996
 La Nación Subrepticia: Lo Monstruoso Y Lo Maldito En La Cultura Argentina, 1998.
 Restos pampeanos. Ciencia, ensayo y politica en la cultura Argentina del siglo XX, 1999.
 Cóncavo y convexo, 1999.
 Historia crítica de la sociología Argentina. Los raros, los clásicos, los científicos, los discrepantes, 2000.
 La crisálida. Metamorfosis y dialéctica, 2001.
 Retórica y locura. Para una teoría de la cultura Argentina, 2003
 Filosofía de la conspiración. Marxistas, peronistas y carbonarios, 2004
 La memoria en el atril, 2005
 Los asaltantes del cielo. Política y emancipación, 2006
 Escritos en carbonilla. figuraciones, destinos, relatos, 2006
 Perón: reflejos de una vida, 2007
 Paul Groussac: La lengua emigrada, 2007.
 Las hojas de la memoria. Un siglo y medio de periodismo obrero y social, 2007.
 Beligerancia de los idiomas. Un siglo y medio de discusión sobre la lengua latinoamericana, 2008
 El arte de viajar en taxi. Aguafuertes pasajeras, 2009.

References

Argentine people of Italian descent
Argentine essayists
Male essayists
Argentine male writers
Argentine sociologists
University of Buenos Aires alumni
University of São Paulo alumni
People from Buenos Aires
1944 births
2021 deaths
Deaths from the COVID-19 pandemic in Argentina